The Château de la Trave is a château in Préchac, Gironde, Nouvelle-Aquitaine, France.

Châteaux in Gironde
Monuments historiques of Gironde